The Biggs site (15Gp8), also known as the Portsmouth Earthworks Group D, is an Adena culture archaeological site located near South Shore in Greenup County, Kentucky. Biggs was originally a concentric circular embankment and ditch surrounding a central conical burial mound with a causeway crossing the ring and ditch. It was part of a larger complex, the Portsmouth Earthworks located across the Ohio River, now mostly obliterated by agriculture and the developing city of Portsmouth, Ohio.

Description
The site was surveyed and mapped by E. G. Squier in 1847 for inclusion in the seminal archaeological and anthrolopological work Ancient Monuments of the Mississippi Valley. They encircled an area  in diameter.

Gallery

See also
 Hardin Village site
 Lower Shawneetown
 Thompson site

References

External links

 Black and white photo of site, Jan 23, 1939, The William S. Webb Museum WPA/TVA Photograph Archive
 Working with the EM38 Earth Conductivity Meter: Geophysical Survey at the Hopeton Earthwork, Chillicothe, Ohio, May, 2001
 Scioto Historical : Portsmouth Earthworks Tour

Adena culture
Archaeological sites in Kentucky
Buildings and structures in Greenup County, Kentucky
1847 archaeological discoveries
Native American history of Kentucky